The London Institute is a previous name of the University of the Arts London, England.

London Institute may also refer to:

 The London Institute of Banking & Finance, a training and professional body for financial services in England and Wales
 London Institute for Mathematical Sciences, a private academic research centre in London, England
 London Institute of 'Pataphysics
 City and Guilds of London Institute, a vocational education organisation in the UK

See also
 London Institution
 Institute of Education University of London, the education school of University College London, England
 Lyndon Institute